Rose Mary Magers-Powell (born June 25, 1960 in Big Spring, Texas) is a retired female volleyball player from the United States, who won the silver medal with the USA National Women's Team at the 1984 Summer Olympics in Los Angeles, California under the guidance of coach Arie Selinger.  She played college women's volleyball with the Houston Cougars.  Resides in Huntsville Al, with husband Harry Powell and 2 sons, William Powell and Brandon Powell.

She is currently head coach at Alabama A&M university in Huntsville, Alabama.

References

 
 US Olympic Team
 Atari Magazines
 RCVC
 MMC Volleyball

1960 births
Living people
American women's volleyball players
American volleyball coaches
Volleyball players at the 1984 Summer Olympics
Olympic silver medalists for the United States in volleyball
People from Big Spring, Texas
Houston Cougars women's volleyball players
Medalists at the 1984 Summer Olympics
Sportspeople from Texas
Pan American Games medalists in volleyball
Pan American Games silver medalists for the United States
Medalists at the 1983 Pan American Games